The simple station Suba-Avenida Boyacá is part of the TransMilenio mass-transit system of Bogotá, Colombia, which opened in 2000.

Location 
The station is located in northwestern Bogotá on Avenida Suba at its intersection with Avenida Boyacá (Diagonal 129C).

It serves the Las Villas, Ciudad Jardín Norte, Calatrava and Altos de Chozica neighborhoods.

History 
In 2006, phase two of the TransMilenio system was completed, including the Avenida Suba line, on which this station is located.

The station is named Suba-Avenida Boyacá or -abbreviated- Suba Av. Boyacá for being located at the intersection of the two major avenues.

It was the first station in the system to be located on a bridge. In the lower part of the station, where two pedestrian bridges provide access to the station, there is a small plaza where payment for the system is collected. Passengers may reach the platform by elevator.

Station services

Main line service

Feeder routes 
This station does not have connections to feeder routes (Spanish: Alimentadores).

Inter-city service 
This station does not have inter-city service.

See also 
 Bogotá
 TransMilenio
 List of TransMilenio stations
 Avenida Suba

External links 
 Official website TransMilenio

TransMilenio
Suba